The Zhinvali Dam is a hydroelectric dam on the Aragvi River in the Caucasus Mountains in Zhinvali, Georgia. The Zhinvali Hydroelectric Power Plant has two turbines with a nominal capacity of 65 MW each having a total capacity of 130 MW.

The building of the dam in 1986 formed the Zhinvali Reservoir.

See also

 List of power stations in Georgia (country)
 Energy in Georgia (country)

References

External links

Dams in Georgia (country)
Hydroelectric power stations in Georgia (country)
Hydroelectric power stations built in the Soviet Union
Dams completed in 1986